Paramsacta is a genus of moths in the family Erebidae. It includes two species:
 Paramsacta marginata (Donovan, 1805)
 Paramsacta moorei (Butler, 1876)

Probably, some species of Aloa sensu lato also belong to this genus.

References
 , 2004: A new genus is established for Bombyx lineola Fabricius, 1793, with systematic notes on the genus Aloa Walker, 1855 (Lepidoptera, Arctiidae). Atalanta 35 (3/4): 297-307, colour plate XVIb.
Natural History Museum Lepidoptera generic names catalog

Spilosomina
Moth genera